This is a list of all personnel changes that occurred during the 2017 Women's National Basketball League (WNBL) off-season and 2017–18 WNBL season.

Incoming Movement

Returning

Incoming (Domestic)

Incoming (International)

Outgoing Movement

Going overseas

Retirement

References

2017–18 WNBL season
Women's National Basketball League lists